James Dodson may refer to:

 James Dodson (mathematician) (1705–1757), British mathematician, actuary and innovator in the insurance industry
 James Dodson (author) (born 1953), American sports writer